Ingles Markets, Inc. (stylized as ingles) is an American supermarket chain based in Black Mountain, North Carolina. As of September 2021, the company operates 198 supermarkets in the Southeastern United States. The company is listed on the NASDAQ under the ticker symbol IMKTA and is part of the Global Select Market tier of trading.

As an adjunct to its supermarket business, Ingles owns and operates shopping centers, gas stations and a milk processing plant.

History
The first Ingles store was opened by second-generation grocer Robert P. Ingle in 1963 and located in Asheville, North Carolina. Ingle had worked in his father's store since he was five years old and was unable to convince his father to build a large store. The younger Ingle had a vision of 4000 square feet. When Elmer Ingle died in the 1950s, Robert Ingle sold the store because his mother could not run it. Seven years later at age 29 Ingle decided to build a new 10,000-square-foot store. He would have to compete with larger chains and with independent stores that used cooperative distributors.

To start his business, Ingle joined with his mother and sister, and they used all of their savings and a mortgage on the house. The first store opened on Hendersonville Road. In one year, that store was expanded, and in another year, a second location opened on Patton Avenue. Ingles was incorporated in 1965 in the state of North Carolina.  In 1967 the company bought six Colonial supermarkets.

In 1982, Ingles purchased a milk processing plant from Sealtest, which it operates as Milkco Inc., a wholly owned subsidiary. Two-thirds of Milkco's business, which was later expanded beyond dairy to include products such as citrus, tea, and bottled water, is from food service distributors, grocery warehouses, and independent specialty retailers located in 17 states as of 2010.  Ingles became a publicly traded company in 1987.

In the 2000s, the chain started building "Ingles Gas Express" gas stations with many of its newer stores.

In February 2005, Ingles Markets announced it would restate financial statements for fiscal years 2002 and 2003 and the first three quarters of 2004, to correct the accounting for vendor allowances and certain other items.  The restatement was a significant factor in
the U.S. Securities and Exchange Commission (SEC) issuing a Wells notice to the firm in January 2006, indicating that it might bring enforcement action against it. A settlement was reached with the SEC in April 2006 that did not require payment of a monetary penalty. 

Following the death of Robert Ingle on March 6, 2011, his son Robert P. Ingle II became CEO.

In December 2012 and December 2013, the company collaborated with Eblen Charities' St. Nicholas Project on what they called "Ingles Toy Store," offering "toys, games, clothes and stocking stuffers" to needy North Carolina families.

In July 2021, Ingles has collaborated with Creating A Family.

Operations
Ingles owns 163 of its 198 supermarkets either as free-standing locations or in shopping centers where it is the anchor tenant.  The remaining 36 locations are leased from various unaffiliated third parties.  The company also owns 23 undeveloped sites which are suitable for a free-standing store or shopping center development.  The company owns numerous outparcels and other acreage located adjacent to the shopping centers and supermarkets it owns.  Real estate owned by the Company is generally located in the same geographic regions as its supermarkets.  Ingles also operates 111 pharmacies and 107 gas stations at select retail locations.  As of 2021, Ingles had a workforce of approximately 26,000 associates.

Ingles also owns and operates nine supermarkets under the name Sav-Mor, with the other 189 locations being Ingles Markets.  The Sav-Mor store concept accommodates smaller shopping areas and carries dry groceries, dairy, fresh meat and produce, all of which are displayed in a modern, readily accessible environment.

Substantially all of Ingles' stores are located within  of its warehouse and distribution facilities, near Asheville, North Carolina.  The Company operates 1.65 million square feet of warehouse and distribution facilities.  These facilities supply the company’s supermarkets with approximately 62% of the goods the company sells.  The remaining 38% is purchased from third parties and is generally delivered directly to the stores.  The close proximity of the company’s purchasing and distribution operations to its stores facilitates the timely distribution of consistently high quality perishable and non-perishable items.

The company owns a 1,649,000 square foot facility, which is strategically located between Interstate 40 and Highway 70 near Asheville, North Carolina, as well as the 119 acres of land on which it is situated.  The facility includes the company’s headquarters and its warehouse and distribution facility.  The property also includes truck servicing and fuel storage facilities.  The company also owns a 139,000 square foot warehouse on 21 acres of land approximately one mile from its main warehouse and distribution facility.  Goods from the warehouse and distribution facilities and the milk processing and packaging plant are distributed to the company’s stores by a fleet of 193 tractors and 751 trailers that the company owns, operates and maintains.

Locations
Ingles operates 197 stores in six southeastern states:
Alabama: 1
Georgia: 65
North Carolina: 75
South Carolina: 35
Tennessee: 21
Virginia: 1

Private label brands 
Ingles sells products with the Laura Lynn brand, named for Ingle's daughter Laura Lynn, now Laura Ingle Sharp. She worked in advertising for the chain starting in the 1970s and has been a member of the board of directors since 1997. The chain sells natural and organic products under the Harvest Farms label. A few other products are sold with the Ingles Best label.

Competition
Local and regional competitors include Food City, Food Lion, Harris Teeter, Harveys, Target, Aldi, Lidl, Walmart, Kroger, Lowes Foods, Publix, and United Grocery Outlet.

References

External links

 Official website

Companies based in Asheville, North Carolina
Retail companies established in 1963
Supermarkets of the United States
Economy of the Southeastern United States
Companies listed on the Nasdaq
1963 establishments in North Carolina